Good Queen Bess: The Story of Elizabeth I of England is a 1990 children's biography by Diane Stanley and Peter Vennema. It describes the life and times during her reign from 1558 to 1603.

Reception
Booklist wrote "This biography of Queen Elizabeth I does an excellent job of describing the context of her life so that reasons for many of her actions become clear. The resulting depth is a pleasant surprise and will give the book a wide audience." while the School Library Journal wrote "Although the format suggests a picture-book audience, this biography needs to be introduced to older readers who have the background to appreciate and understand this woman who dominated and named an age.."

Kirkus Reviews called Good Queen Bess "An admirably clear, attractive summary." Publishers Weekly wrote "The authors .. vivify another colorful character"

Awards and nominations
1991 Boston Globe–Horn Book Award - honor

References

External links

Library holdings of Good Queen Bess

1990 children's books
American children's books
Cultural depictions of Elizabeth I
Children's history books